Robert Malt (born 4 November 1951) is an English former footballer who played as a centre forward in the Football League for Darlington and in non-league football for clubs including South Shields, Silksworth CW and Ryhope Community Association. He was born in Ryhope, County Durham, attended Ryhope Junior School, and represented Seaham Boys at football before joining Leeds United when he left school, but never played for that club's first team.

References

1951 births
Living people
People from the City of Sunderland
Footballers from Tyne and Wear
English footballers
Association football forwards
Leeds United F.C. players
Darlington F.C. players
South Shields F.C. (1936) players
Silksworth Colliery F.C. players
Sunderland Ryhope Community Association F.C. players
English Football League players